Housing quality and health outcomes in the United States are inextricably linked. As a matter of U.S. public health, substandard housing is associated with outcomes such as injury, respiratory infections, heavy metal (e.g. lead) poisoning and asthma. It may also be associated with mental disability and with obesity and its related morbidities.

Introduction
According to the World Health Organization (WHO), housing should provide:

 protection against communicable diseases,
 protection against injury, poisoning, and chronic diseases,
 and reduce psychological and social stresses to a minimum.

The United States Department of Housing and Urban Development (HUD) 2007 American Housing Survey determined that 6 million households live with moderate or severe physical housing problems.  Homes that are lacking toilets, have faulty or unreliable heating systems, or have exposed electrical wiring do not protect inhabitants from disease and injury and can cause serious psychological stress are categorized as being "severe" housing problems. "Moderate" housing problems are things such as having unvented gas, oil, or kerosene as the primary heating source, or lacking a kitchen sink. Again, the lack of commonplace appliances like a furnace or sink can expose inhabitants to diseases and injury.

The U.S. Census Bureau gathers data on several factors related to the housing: plumbing, heating, hallways, upkeep, electric service and kitchen equipment. As many as 24 million households have lead-based paint hazards. Maintenance and upkeep of public and low-income housing remains a major issue, leading to chronic problems of water infiltration, pest infestation and unsafe physical conditions. The disproportionate burden of these problems falls to children, the elderly and those with chronic illnesses, and minorities.

Neighborhoods

Housing quality is also an indicator of neighborhood conditions. Neighborhoods that are seen as bad or deteriorating are often characterized by the conditions of the housing in that neighborhood. Poor neighborhood conditions can be defined as having abandoned buildings, vacant lots, no access to quality schools, and high levels of poverty. These neighborhood dynamics can contribute to a person's psychological and social stress.

In low-income neighborhoods crime and noxious noise and odors can force individuals to isolate in substandard homes, which often characterize low-income neighborhoods. The combination of avoiding outside activity and isolating in dangerous living spaces leads to negative health outcomes such as obesity, lead poisoning, and asthma.

History
Housing quality has greatly improved since the beginning of the 20th century. However, today close to 6 million American live in severe or moderate housing conditions. The majority of those living in these extreme housing conditions are minorities and renters. Today’s poor housing and neighborhood conditions are a symptom of historic inner city disinvestment and population lose influenced by ill-conceived federal housing policy and finance.

After World War II, the Federal Housing Administration (FHA) played a major part in influencing those with the means to leave the inner city for the suburbs. According to Schwartz, the FHA gave preferential treatment to insuring mortgages in the suburbs rather than the inner city. The FHA considered black neighborhoods too risky of an investment to insure mortgages. The result was many middle-class families left the inner city, taking with them jobs and opportunity. This left poor black families in neighborhoods that were quickly beginning to be characterized by vacant lots, abandoned buildings, crime, and economic insecurity.

Today, the recent recession, foreclosure crisis, and the decline of the U.S. auto industry has further exacerbated many of the problems inner city neighborhoods face. People are moving out of their neighborhoods as banks foreclose their homes leaving blocks of vacant homes and lots. Those left in declining neighborhoods are more likely to experience the negative health outcomes associated with poor housing and neighborhood conditions.

Statistics
Poor housing conditions can also be characterized by race and geography. Of the 6 million Americans who experience poor housing conditions, blacks and Hispanics fare much worse than whites. Moreover, poor housing conditions are disproportionately found in inner cities and rural areas as opposed to the suburbs. Inner city minorities have poorer health than suburban whites. 
Black homeowners are more likely than Hispanic and white homeowners to experience severe and moderate housing problems. 2.1% of all homeowners have moderate housing quality problems. 5.9% of black homeowners and 3.8% of Hispanic homeowners experience moderate housing quality problems.

Black renters are more likely than Hispanics and whites to experience severe and moderate housing conditions. 6.9% of all renters have moderate housing quality problems. 7.9% of black renters and 7.1% of Hispanic renters. 3.1% of all renters have severe housing problems. 4.2% of black renters and 3.4% of Hispanic renters.

Homeowners and renters in central cities and rural areas are more likely than homeowners and renters in the suburbs to experience severe or moderate housing problems. Of those with severe housing problems, 20% more were in central cities and 10% more were located in rural areas than in suburban areas. Of those with severe housing problems, nearly 20% more were located in central cities.

Specific health outcomes
Asthma and respiratory illnesses
Asthma is a major reason for childhood hospitalizations as well as absenteeism from schools.  Asthmatic children living in homes with cockroaches, mice and mold may be especially prone to episodes requiring medical care.  Direct health care costs of asthma totaled more than $14.7 billion in 2008.  $5 billion annually in indirect costs, primarily from lost productivity, can be added to the total.  According to the Centers for Disease Control and Prevention, almost 13 million lost school days, 4 million asthma attacks and nearly 4,000 deaths yearly are associated with asthma. Water infiltration and poor ventilation increases the likelihood that moisture will be an issue in a home, which can lead to infestation of pests and to mold growth, known triggers of allergies and asthma.
   
Lead
High lead levels (blood levels ≥10 micrograms per deciliter) are associated with a number of poor health outcomes, including: learning disabilities, behavioral and neurological problems, and, in severe cases, death.  Even relatively low blood lead levels can have negative health impacts. The impact on the individual and on society in terms of lost potential can be dramatic. Those living in older, poorly maintained housing are at the greatest risk, and many of these housing units are home to low-income families  Even though blood levels are dropping in much of the population in the United States, the poorest children remain at the greatest risk because they are most likely to live in older, poorly maintained housing.

Unintentional injuries
Unintentional injury is the leading cause of death among children under the age of 15.  Deaths from residential injuries accounted for an average of 2,822 deaths annually from 1985-1997. The rates of death associated with residential injury are equally significant amongst those aged 65 and older. Poorly maintained stairs, sidewalks, bad lighting, and inadequate facilities for people with limited mobility or sensory impairments are all implicated in injury rates.

Chronic illness
Even after accounting for other potential contributors like income, smoking or employment status, poor housing conditions are associated with an increased risk of chronic respiratory infection. Unsanitary conditions made more severe by aging and poorly constructed structures, exacerbate the problem.  Poor heating and cooling lead to an increased risk of temperature related illnesses. Heat stroke and exhaustion are a major cause of mortality and morbidity, especially for the elderly. Conversely, exposure to cold temperatures can contribute to an increased use of health services.

Nutrition and obesity
“Food deserts”, areas that lack grocery stores or markets that contain healthful foods like fruits and vegetables, are primarily found in high poverty, inner-city areas where residents lack the resources to travel. These areas are also known for selling convenience foods and liquor. Rates of obesity and the related illnesses are much higher in these areas than in higher income communities with easy access to fresh foods. A correlation has been determined for a connection between food insecurity associated with housing cost burdens and under-nutrition. A lack of adequate play areas for children, poor lighting or sidewalk condition can also lead to a lack of physical activity which is associated with increased obesity and associated morbidities, such as type II diabetes, cancer and cardiovascular disease.

Intentional injuries
Neighborhoods of low socioeconomic status are associated with higher rates of intentional injuries (violent crime). Poor investment in community property, and the lack of private and semi-private space can lead to the inability of residents to properly or adequately maintain defensible space.  A lack of “eyes of the street” due to poor design or poor maintenance only makes crime prevention more difficult.

Housing Hazards 
Most significant aspects of poor housing are linked to various adverse health effects ranked by highest number of people affected. These housing hazards are linked to many health effects like respiratory symptoms, asthma, lung cancer, depression, injury, hypothermia and death. 
 Air quality
 Hygrothermal conditions (warmth and humidity)
 Radon
 Noise
 House dust mites
 Environmental tobacco smoke
 Fires

Physical deficiencies

A number of housing-quality issues directly or indirectly affect health outcomes, some of which are not addressed by the U.S. Census Bureau, or HUD.

Ventilation:  Inadequate ventilation, either through natural or mechanical means, can allow for excess moisture in the house which can lead to mold growth or pests.  Mold and by-products of pest infestations can exacerbate symptoms of allergies and asthma for sensitive individuals.
Heating & cooling:  Inadequate temperature control is directly related to heat injuries.  The elderly and the young are especially sensitive to over-heating.  Each summer, people living in housing with no or poor cooling facilities are hospitalized or die.  Conversely, extreme cold temperatures can contribute to an increased use of medical services.
Water infiltration:  A major contributor to pest infiltration.  Cockroaches, rats and mice require a stable source of water, and without it, they will not inhabit a building.
Lead and chemical hazards:  Lead has remained a constant contaminant in the older housing stock in the United States.  Lead was commonly used in house paints until it was banned in the U.S. in 1977.  Additionally, tetraethyl lead was used as a gasoline additive until the 1990s. These common uses contributed to the lead that is found in and around houses, and that contribute to lead poisoning.  Lead has received much attention as it is both ubiquitous and recognizably harmful to health.  There are however a number of other potential or know hazardous chemicals used in the construction or maintenance of housing.  Included in these are formaldehyde, flame retardants and plasticizers.
Neighborhood context:  Where the housing is located is a significant factor in determining health outcomes.  Unsafe neighborhoods, due to crime, traffic, or other infrastructure problems, force residents indoors, discourage neighborhood connections and inhibit outdoor activities.
Maintenance: Poorly maintained housing is a significant contributor to many of the other issues, including ventilation, heating and cooling and chemical exposures.  It is also related to unintentional injuries; broken sidewalks and stairs, inadequate lighting and plumbing problems are just a few of the common maintenance problems.

Interventions / Policy
There are several factors policy-makers and housing quality and health advocates need to consider when thinking about potential solutions to the problems of housing quality and health.
First, solutions need to be comprehensive. This means solutions should consider not just the home but also the entire community. For example, characteristics associated with poor housing quality such as cockroaches, ventilation, or moisture can cause negative health outcomes such as asthma. While cockroaches are a symptom of poor ventilation and moisture, they may also be a consequence of a community-wide problem, such as trash left unattended in the street. Solutions that focus only on the home may be missing a key factor, community norms.
Second, it is important to consider the role discrimination plays when it comes to the race and geography of poor housing conditions. Discrimination is a possible reason why minorities, blacks in particular, are more likely to live in poor quality neighborhoods compared to whites. Strengthening or enforcing Fair Housing laws is one way to narrow the disparity between not only the housing conditions of blacks and whites but also the disparities of their health outcomes.
Third, careful attention needs to be paid to the relationship between housing and health trends. The relationships between housing and health trends are both positive and negative. For example, the increased use of air conditioning units may be related to increases in incidence of asthma. There may be a relationship between deteriorating neighborhood conditions and stress related health outcomes. Policy makers need to  consider the financial costs of these negative outcomes as they develop plans and designs for housing and neighborhoods.

See also
ARCHIVE Global

References

Economic inequality in the United States
Affordable housing
United States Department of Housing and Urban Development
Housing in the United States